Hermann Kopp (born 21 August 1954, in Stuttgart) is a German composer and musician, presently living in Barcelona, Spain.

Biography
In the early eighties, Kopp released two vinyl records with a sound that can be vaguely classified as electronic minimalism and then became a member of the German electro-industrial band Keine Ahnung with which he played live in Mannheim and Berlin. In 1987 he participated in the soundtrack of the German horror film Nekromantik, followed in 1989 by music to the movie Der Todesking and in 1990 to Nekromantik 2. Unlike the early song material that tends to be intimist and voluntarily drawing on the kitsch side, his film scores create uneasy and haunting atmospheres,  weaving atonal strings, slow motion rhythms, moog synthesizers and plain noise into soundtrack form. In 2007, Hermann Kopp released “Psicofonico”, abstract violin soundscapes influenced by a Spanish documentary on the Electronic Voice Phenomena. In 2007 he got signed to the German label Galakthorrö, known for its releases of industrial music, maintaining his own morbid musical language.
Cooperations with other musicians comprise the Italian artists Lorenzo Abattoir and Bathory Legion, the British act Am Not, the British doomcore band Fifth Era and the German project Schattenspiel.

Hermann Kopp has had releases on the following labels throughout his career:

 Passiv
 Red Stream
 Vinyl On Demand
 Bataille
 Galakthorrö
 Aesthetic Records
 4iB Records
 Alien Passengers

In Other Media

In the movie Der Todesking Hermann Kopp plays a part as a man drowning himself in his bathtub. His name in the film, Barsch, bears similarities with the German politician Uwe Barschel who was found dead around the same time in the bathtub of a hotel in Geneva, following a political scandal that became popular under the name of “Waterkantgate”.

Soundtracks 
 Nekromantik 1987
 Der Todesking 1989
 Nekromantik 2 1990
 The Queen Of Hollywood Boulevard 2017

Selected discography
"Aquaplaning in Venedig", Vinyl-EP 1981
"Pop", Vinyl-LP, 1983
"Japgirls in Synthesis", Vinyl-LP, 2004
"Nekronology", CD, 2004, reissued on Vinyl in 2009
"Kitsch", Vinyl-LP, 2004
"Mondo Carnale", Vinyl-LP, 2005
"Psicofonico", CD, 2007
"Under A Demon's Mask", Vinyl and CD, 2008
"Cerveau D'Enfant", Vinyl-EP, 2010
 "Zyanidanger", Vinyl and CD, 2013
"Sinekdoxa", Tape, 2014
"Cantos Y Llantos", Vinyl-EP, 2017

External links 
 http://www.hermannkopp.com
 https://www.imdb.com/name/nm0465841

1954 births
Living people
German film score composers
Male film score composers
German male composers